The blue warehou (Seriolella brama) or common warehou is a medusafish of the family Centrolophidae found off southern Australia and around New Zealand, at depths of between 5m and 400m.  Its length is up to about 75 cm.

The blue warehou is not to be confused with the bluenose warehou (usually referred to simply as bluenose in New Zealand, and bonita, big-eye or Griffin's silverfish by others), which is a deepwater member of the warehou family.

References
Web references

Bibliography
 
 Tony Ayling & Geoffrey Cox, Collins Guide to the Sea Fishes of New Zealand, (William Collins Publishers, Auckland, New Zealand 1982) 

Centrolophidae
Marine fish of Eastern Australia
Marine fish of Tasmania
Marine fish of New Zealand
Fish described in 1860
Taxa named by Albert Günther